Royal Noble Consort Gong of the Gimhae Kim clan (Hangul: 공빈 김씨, Hanja: 恭嬪 金氏; 16 November 1553 – 13 June 1577) was a royal consort of Seonjo of Joseon, and the mother of Yi Jin, Prince Imhae and Yi Hon, King Gwanghaegun, the 15th King of Joseon.

Life 
Lady Kim was born into the Gimhae Kim clan in 1553 as the daughter of Kim Hui-cheol and Lady Kwon of the Andong Kwon clan. She was the eldest of three children.

She entered the palace and became a concubine of Seonjo of Joseon. Lady Kim became Royal Consort Suk-ui (숙의, 淑儀) when she gave birth to Yi Jin in 1572, the King's eldest son. She eventually became Royal Consort Gwi-in (귀인, 貴人) in 1575 when she gave birth to Yi Hon, Prince Gwanghae. 

Her father died in 1592 while serving as a medic in the Imjin War. This put Prince Gwanghae’s position as crown prince in jeopardy because the Royal consort had no one to support her and her two sons.

It is recorded that King Seonjo cared greatly for her and when she died due to a postpartum disease he mourned for her. She monopolized the love of the king, and because of this, other concubines were often neglected. When her life was in jeopardy, she said that someone was cursing her and told her that she would die if King Seonjo did not investigate quickly.

After her death, Seonjo became much harsher to his other concubines. However, he met Palace Lady Kim (the future Royal Noble Consort In of the Suwon Kim clan) who became Royal Consort So-yong (소용 김씨, 昭容 金氏) as Seonjo showed more favour towards her than anyone after the death of Royal Noble Consort Gong.

After her son Gwanghaegun became King, she was posthumously appointed Queen Gongseong (공성왕후, 恭聖王后) while adding Jasukdanin (자숙단인, 慈淑端仁). In 1615, her son added Gyeongryeol (경렬, 敬烈) and Myeongheon (명헌, 明獻) in 1616; thus completing her posthumous to Gyeongryeol Myeongheon Jasuk Danin (경렬명헌자숙단인공성왕후, 敬烈明獻慈淑端仁恭聖王后). But she was stripped of her title, and was given back the title of Bin after her son was deposed in 1623.

Her burial site is in Seongmyo Royal Tomb, Namyangju, Gyeonggi Province.

Family 

 Father: Kim Hui-Cheol, Internal Prince Haeryeong (김희철 해령부원군)(1519 - 1 August 1592)
 Paternal grandfather: Kim Jong-soo (김종수, 金從壽)
 Paternal grandmother: Lady Jeong of the Hadong Jeong clan (하동 정씨)
 Mother: Lady Kwon of the Andong Kwon clan (정경부인 안동 권씨)
 Maternal Grandfather: Kwon Jang (권장, 權璋)
 Maternal Grandmother: Lady Heo of the Gimhae Heo clan (김해 허씨, 金海 許氏)
 Siblings
 Younger brother: Kim Ye-jik (김예직, 金禮直) (1565 - 1623)
 Younger brother: Kim Ui-jik (김의직, 金義直)
 Husband: Yi Yeon, King Seonjo (조선 선조) (26 November 1552 - 16 March 1608)
 Son: Yi Jin, Prince Imhae (20 September 1572 – 3 June 1609) (이진 임해군)
 Daughter-in-law: Princess Consort Heo of the Yangcheon Heo clan (군부인 양천 허씨, 郡夫人 陽川 許氏) (1571 - 1644)
 Unnamed granddaughter; died prematurely 
Grandson: Yi Tae-ung (이태웅; 1589–1665) 
Adoptive Grandson: Yi Jun, Prince Changwon (이준 창원군)
 Adoptive Grandson: Yi Gyeong, Prince Yangnyeong (양녕군 이경) (1616 - 1644)
 Son: Yi Hon, King Gwanghaegun (4 June 1575 – 7 August 1641) (조선 광해군)
 Daughter-in-law: Deposed Queen Hyeyang of Munhwa Yu clan (혜장왕후 유씨) (15 August 1576 - 31 October 1623)
 Unnamed grandson (1596 - 1596)
 Grandson: Yi Jin, Deposed Crown Prince (31 December 1598 - 22 July 1623)
 Unnamed grandson (1601 - 1603)

In popular culture 

 Portrayed by Park Ju-mi in the 1999-2000 MBC TV series Hur Jur
 Portrayed by Jang Ji-eun in the 2013 MBC TV series Hur Jun, The Original Story
 Portrayed by Yu Shin-ae in the 2013 MBC TV series Goddess of Fire, Jung Yi

References 

1553 births
1577 deaths
Royal consorts of the Joseon dynasty
16th-century Korean people